Beetzendorf is a municipality in the district Altmarkkreis Salzwedel, in Saxony-Anhalt, Germany. It consists of the following Ortsteile or municipal divisions:

Audorf
Bandau
Beetzendorf
Darnebeck
Groß Gischau
Hohentramm
Jeeben
Käcklitz
Klein Gischau
Mellin
Neumühle
Peertz
Poppau
Siedengrieben
Stapen
Tangeln
Wohlgemuth

Since 1 January 2009 it has incorporated the former municipalities of Bandau, Hohentramm, Jeeben, Mellin and Tangeln.

Among other more older villages like Mellin, an ecological project had been constructed since 1997 near Poppau, the Ecovillage Sieben Linden.

Notable people
 Frederick Klaeber, philologist

References

External links 

Municipalities in Saxony-Anhalt
 
Altmarkkreis Salzwedel